Alano is both a surname and a given name. It is the Spanish and Italian cognate of Alan. Notable people with the name include:

Surname:
Alyssa Alano (born 1987), Filipino actress
Boy Alano (born 1944), Filipino actor
Kat Alano (born 1985), English-Filipino actress and model

Given name:
Alano Miller, American actor 
Alano Montanari, Italian motorcycle racer